Zagovorukha is a rural locality (a village) in Krasnovishersky District, Perm Krai, Russia. The population was 81 as of 2010. There are 3 streets.

Geography 
Zagovorukha is located 23 km northeast of Krasnovishersk (the district's administrative centre) by road. Visherogorsk is the nearest rural locality.

References 

Rural localities in Krasnovishersky District